Thai Meteorological Department (TMD) has a total of 118 weather stations throughout Thailand, including 21 Agromet stations.

Weather stations in Thailand

Thailand is according to Thai Meteorological Department (TMD) for climatic observations divided into six regions: northern, northeastern, eastern, central, southern (west coast) and southern (east coast) Thailand.

Northern region

The northern region includes the 15 provinces:

TMD weather stations in northern Thailand
There are a total of 29 weather stations in northern Thailand, including 5 Agromet stations.

TMD weather station Phitsanulok

Like all TMD weather stations in Thailand, the weather station has its own website. The weather forecasts are at 1.00, 4.00, 7.00, 10.00, 13.00, 16.00, 19.00 and 22.00 hour.
This weather station (48378) distributes the weather forecasts every day at 7.30, 8.30, 12.30,13.30,19.30 and 20.30 via radio broadcast on FM 104.25 MHz, these include the weather forecasts of the five neighboring weather stations.
The weather station is located near Phitsanulok airport. But both the Royal Thai Air Force and civil aviation use their own weather station for the pilots' briefing.
In the northern region just five stations have a weather radar with a radius of 120 km or 240 km, they are station Chiang Rai, Lamphun, Phitsanulok, Phetchabun and Tha Wang Pha.

Agromet station Phichit
Agromet stations deliver climatic data direct to TMD centers. Agromet station Phichit (48386) distributes the weather forecasts every day at 1.00, 4.00, 7.00, 10.00, 13.00, 16.00, 19.00 and 22.00 hour via its own website.

Weather forecasts northern Thailand
{|
|---valigh=top
||
Mae Hong Son and Mae Sariang.
Chiang Mai and Doi Ang Khang. 
Lamphun. 
Chiang Rai and Chiang Rai Agromet. 
Phayao. 
Nan, Tha Wang Pha and Thung Chang.
Phrae.
Lampang, Thoen and Lampang Agromet.
||
<ol start=9>
Tak, Bhumibol dam, Doi Mu Soe A., Mae Sot and Umphang.   
Kamphaeng Phet. 
Sukhothai and Si Samrong Agromet. 
Uttaradit. 
Phitsanulok. 
Phichit Agromet. 
Phetchabun, Lom Sak and Wichian Buri. 
||
|}

Notes
 In this overview of weather stations, an Agromet station is omitted if it is located close to  TMD weather station.

References

Meteorological stations
Meteorological Department weather stations in northern Thailand